Harold "Dean" Conley (April 15, 1946 – May 19, 2010) was a former member of the Ohio House of Representatives.

References

1946 births
Democratic Party members of the Ohio House of Representatives
2010 deaths
People from Paintsville, Kentucky